John F. Schwegmann House is a historic home located at Washington, Franklin County, Missouri. It was built in 1861, and is a two-story, double pile, Georgian form brick dwelling with Italianate and Greek Revival style detailing.  It has two shed roofed rear additions.  It has a side gable roof with dormers and a replicated original iron balcony and wrought iron railings.

It was listed on the National Register of Historic Places in 1984.

References

Houses on the National Register of Historic Places in Missouri
Georgian architecture in Missouri
Italianate architecture in Missouri
Greek Revival houses in Missouri
Houses completed in 1861
Buildings and structures in Franklin County, Missouri
National Register of Historic Places in Franklin County, Missouri